Amy Spurway is a Canadian writer, whose debut novel Crow was published in 2019. The novel, a black comedy about a woman returning home to Cape Breton Island to reunite with her estranged family after being diagnosed with terminal brain cancer, was a shortlisted finalist for the 2020 Stephen Leacock Memorial Medal for Humour and the 2020 ReLit Award for fiction.

Originally from the Cape Breton Regional Municipality, Spurway was educated at the University of New Brunswick and Ryerson University, and has also written for Today's Parent and the Toronto Star. She currently lives in Dartmouth.

References

External links
 

21st-century Canadian novelists
21st-century Canadian women writers
Canadian women novelists
People from the Cape Breton Regional Municipality
People from Dartmouth, Nova Scotia
Writers from Halifax, Nova Scotia
University of New Brunswick alumni
Toronto Metropolitan University alumni
Living people
Year of birth missing (living people)